Amir Pnueli (April 22, 1941 – November 2, 2009) was an Israeli computer scientist and the 1996 Turing Award recipient.

Biography
Pnueli was born in Nahalal, in the British Mandate of Palestine (now in Israel) and received a Bachelor's degree in mathematics from the Technion in Haifa, and  Ph.D. in applied mathematics from the Weizmann Institute of Science (1967). His thesis was on the topic of "Calculation of Tides in the Ocean". He switched to computer science during a stint as a post-doctoral fellow at Stanford University. His works in computer science focused on temporal logic and model checking, particularly regarding fairness properties of concurrent systems.

He returned to Israel as a researcher; he was the founder and first chair of the computer science department at Tel Aviv University. He became a professor of computer science at the Weizmann Institute in 1981. From 1999 until his death, Pnueli also held a position at the Computer Science Department of New York University, New York, U.S.

Pnueli also founded two startup technology companies during his career. He had three children and, at his death, had four grandchildren.

Pnueli died on November 2, 2009 of a brain hemorrhage.

Awards and honours
 In 1996, Pnueli received the Turing Award for seminal work introducing temporal logic into computing science and for outstanding contributions to program and systems verification.
 On May 30, 1997 Pnueli received an honorary doctorate from the Faculty of Science and Technology at Uppsala University, Sweden.
 In 1999, he was inducted as a Foreign Associate of the U.S. National Academy of Engineering.
 In 2000, he was awarded the Israel Prize, for computer science. 
 In 2007, he was inducted as a Fellow of the Association for Computing Machinery.
 The Weizmann Institute of Science presents a memorial lecture series in his honour.

See also
 List of Israel Prize recipients

References

External links
 New York University homepage
 Short biography
 Weizmann Institute homepage
 Profile
 

1941 births
2009 deaths
Fellows of the Association for Computing Machinery
Formal methods people
Israeli Jews
Israeli computer scientists
Israel Prize in computer sciences recipients
Jewish scientists
Members of the Israel Academy of Sciences and Humanities
Courant Institute of Mathematical Sciences faculty
People from Nahalal
Programming language researchers
Technion – Israel Institute of Technology alumni
Academic staff of Tel Aviv University
Theoretical computer scientists
Turing Award laureates
Academic staff of Weizmann Institute of Science
Polytechnic Institute of New York University faculty
Foreign associates of the National Academy of Engineering